John Noel Dempsey (January 3, 1915 – July 16, 1989) was an American politician who was the 81st Governor of Connecticut. He was a Democrat, and began his political career at the age of 21 serving on the Putnam City Council. He later served as mayor of Putnam, before being elected to Governor of Connecticut.

Biography
Dempsey was born in Cahir, County Tipperary, Ireland. He was the only son of a career British Army officer. In 1925, the family moved to Putnam, Connecticut, in the northeastern corner of the state. He worked there in the textile industry and then in the Town Hall, which made the start for his rise in state politics. While living in Putnam, Dempsey was the Soccer Coach at the Pomfret School in Pomfret. He was married to Mary Frey and they had three sons and a daughter.

Political career
In 1936, at the age of 21, Dempsey was elected to the Putnam City Council, and in 1948 he began the first of six terms as mayor. He was elected to the Connecticut House of Representatives in 1949, but managed to divide his time between state and local affairs. He served in the General Assembly until 1955, when he became executive secretary of governor Abraham A. Ribicoff.

Dempsey was the 94th Lieutenant Governor of Connecticut during Ribicoff's last term as governor, from 1959 – 1961. When Ribicoff resigned as Governor of Connecticut to become a member of President John F. Kennedy's Cabinet, Dempsey succeeded him, becoming the first person to hold this position since the early colonial period who had been born in Europe. He also began a 30-year period in which the former Puritan colony had only Catholic governors in office. In 1969, leaders of both parties introduced the Legislative Management Act to establish support staff and control the operating budget of the Assembly. Both houses voted unanimously to override his veto. He was an ally of party chairman John M. Bailey. He chose not to run for re-election in 1970 and was succeeded by Republican Thomas J. Meskill. During his tenure, he served on the Advisory Commission on Intergovernmental Relations, the National Governors Association Executive Committee from 1968 to 1969; also chaired the New England Governors Association from 1963 to 1965 and the Democratic Governors Association from 1969 to 1970. After leaving office, Dempsey became the President of the Indian Trails Council of the Boy Scouts of America.

Death and legacy
The University of Connecticut Health Center in Farmington, Connecticut, is known as John Dempsey Hospital. He was treated for lung cancer there himself in the last month of his life.  He died in his home, on July 16, 1989 at Killingly Center, Windham County, Connecticut. He is interred at Saint Mary Cemetery, Putnam, Windham County, Connecticut.

See also

List of U.S. state governors born outside the United States

References

External links
 New York Times: Former Gov. John Dempsey, 74; Led Connecticut During the 60's
 
Connecticut State Library
National Governors Association

|-

|-

|-

1915 births
1989 deaths
20th-century American politicians
20th-century Irish people
Deaths from lung cancer
Democratic Party governors of Connecticut
Irish emigrants to the United States
Lieutenant Governors of Connecticut
Mayors of places in Connecticut
People from Putnam, Connecticut
People with acquired American citizenship
Politicians from County Tipperary
People from Cahir
Catholics from Connecticut